Craticula is a genus of diatom that lies on or in the top layers of sediments in the freshwater to brackish water environments it inhabits.  In addition to frustule morphology the genus differs from closely related species by its sexual reproduction and movement in response to light.

Species
According to Algaebase, there are 62 species names and 12 intraspecific names:
 Craticula accomoda (Hustedt) D.G.Mann
 Craticula accomodiformis Lange-Bertalot
 Craticula acidoclinata Lange-Bertalot & Metzeltin
 Craticula ambigua (Ehrenberg) D.G.Mann
 Craticula angustilancea H.Lange-Bertalot, P.Cavacini, N.Tagliaventi & S.Alfinito
 Craticula antarctica B.Van de Vijver & K.Sabbe
 Craticula australis Van der Vijver, Kopalová & Zindarova
 Craticula buderi (Hustedt) Lange-Bertalot
 Craticula citroides H.Lange-Bertalot, P.Cavacini, N.Tagliaventi & S.Alfinito
 Craticula citrus (Krasske) Reichardt
 Craticula coloradensis Edlund, D.R.L.Burge & S.A.Spaulding
 Craticula cuspidata (Kutzing) D.G.Mann
 Craticula cuspidata f. tenuirostris A.Cleve-Euler: Invalid
 Craticula cuspidata var. craticula Aysel: Synonym of Craticula cuspidata (Kutzing) D.G.Mann
 Craticula cuspidata var. heribaudii (Peragallo) E.Y.Haworth & M.G.Kelly: Synonym of Navicula cuspidata f. heribaudii (Peragallo) A.Cleve
 Craticula cuspidata var. gracilis (M.Peragallo) Seeligmann, Maidana & Morales
 Craticula cuspidata var. major (Meister) D.B.Czarnecki
 Craticula cuspidata var. media (Meister) M.Aboal
 Craticula dissociata (E.Reichardt) E.Reichardt
 Craticula ehrenbergii Grunow
 Craticula elkab (Otto Müller) Lange-Bertalot, Kusber & Cocquyt
 Craticula frenguellii Metzeltin, Lange-Bertalot & García-Rodríguez
 Craticula fumantii H.Lange-Bertalot, P.Cavacini, N.Tagliaventi & S.Alfinito
 Craticula germainii H.Lange-Bertalot, P.Cavacini, N.Tagliaventi & S.Alfinito
 Craticula glaberrima (W.West & G.S.West) B.van de Vijver, K.Kopalová, R.Zidarova & E.J.Cox
 Craticula guatemalensis (Cleve & E.Grove) Lange-Bertalot
 Craticula guaykuruorum C.E.Wetzel, E.A.Morales & L.Ector
 Craticula halopannonica Lange-Bertalot
 Craticula halophila (Grunow) D.G.Mann
 Craticula halophila f. robusta (Hustedt) Czarnecki: Synonym of Craticula halophila (Grunow) D.G.Mann
 Craticula halophila f. tenuirostris (Hustedt) Czarnecki
 Craticula halophila var. subcapitata (Østrup) D.B.Czarnecki
 Craticula halophilioides (Hustedt) Lange-Bertalot
 Craticula hungarica Pantocsek
 Craticula importuna (Hustedt) K.Bruder & Hinz
 Craticula johnstoniae L.Bahls
 Craticula lanceola H.Lange-Bertalot, P.Cavacini, N.Tagliaventi & S.Alfinito
 Craticula lange-bertalotii E.Reichardt
 Craticula lowei Kociolek
 Craticula megacuspidata (Carlson) Van de Vijver, Kopalová & Zidarova
 Craticula megaloptera (Ehrenberg) Grunow
 Craticula minusculoides (Hustedt) Lange-Bertalot
 Craticula molesta (Krasske) Lange-Bertalot & Willmann: Synonym of Craticula zizix (VanLandingham) Guiry
 Craticula molestiformis (Hustedt) Mayama
 Craticula neglecta H.Lange-Bertalot, P.Cavacini, N.Tagliaventi & S.Alfinito
 Craticula nonambigua H.Lange-Bertalot; P.Cavacini, N.Tagliaventi & S.Alfinito
 Craticula obaesa Van der Vijver, Kopalová & Zindarova
 Craticula orientalis Metzeltin, Lange-Bertalot & Nergui
 Craticula pampeana (Frenguelli) Lange-Bertalot
 Craticula paramolesta H.Lange-Bertalot, P.Cavacini, N.Tagliaventi & S.Alfinito
 Craticula perrotettii Grunow
 Craticula perrotettii var. enervis (Hustedt) B.Hartley: Synonym of Craticula perrotettii Grunow
 Craticula petradeblockiana Van der Vijver, Kopalová & Zindarova
 Craticula procera (Ehrenberg) Grunow
 Craticula regigeorgiensis Zindarova, Kopálova & Van der Vijver
 Craticula riparia (Hustedt) Lange-Bertalot
 Craticula riparia var. mollenhaueri Lange-Bertalot
 Craticula salsuginosa van de Vijver & Beyens
 Craticula sardiniana L.Bahls
 Craticula sardiniensis (Lange-Bertalot, Cavacini, Tagliaventi & Alfinito) E.Morales & M.Le
 Craticula silviae Lange-Bertalot
 Craticula strelnikoviana E.A.Morales, S.F.Rivera & C.E.Wetzel
 Craticula subhalophila (Hustedt) Lange-Bertalot
 Craticula subminuscula (Manguin) Wetzel & Ector
 Craticula submolesta (Hustedt) Lange-Bertalot
 Craticula subpampeana B.Van de Vijver & M.Sterken
 Craticula sverirschopkae Lange-Bertalot
 Craticula vixnegligenda Lange-Bertalot
 Craticula vixvisibilis (Hustedt) Lange-Bertalot
 Craticula vixvisibilis var. distinctior Lange-Bertalot
 Craticula zizix (VanLandingham) Guiry
 Craticula zizix var. subdiversa (Messikommer) Guiry

References

Further reading
 

 

 

Naviculales
Diatom genera